Sitee is a 1993 Maldivian drama film written and directed by Ahmed Nimal. Produced by Aslam Rasheed under Slam Studio in association with Kid Productions, the film stars Nimal and Fathimath Rameeza in pivotal roles.

The film is based on true incidents that occurred to a friend of Ahmed Nimal. Filming was completed in one month while shooting for the songs was extended for another month. The song "Mulhi Jaan Hithaa" is shot in five different islands from five atolls.

Premise
Hameed (Ahmed Nimal), a fisherman, relocates to Male' hunting for jobs when his poor mother, Naseema (Arifa Ibrahim) dies. He is taken in as a servant by a reputed family where he starts an affair with their only child, Shadhiya (Fathimath Rameeza). When their affair is exposed to her father, he expels Hameed from their house where he is then accompanied by Chilhiya Moosa Manik, witnessing his honesty in a prior meeting and treats Hameed as his own child.

Cast 
 Ahmed Nimal as Hameed
 Fathimath Rameeza as Shadhiya
 Chilhiya Moosa Manik
 Abdul Raheem
 Ahmed Shareef
 Ibrahim Shakir as Adam
 Suhail
 Hassan Haleem
 Mohamed Riyaz
 Arifa Ibrahim as Naseema
 Suneetha 
 Aishath Hanim

Soundtrack

Accolades

References

Maldivian drama films
1993 films
Films directed by Ahmed Nimal
1993 drama films
Dhivehi-language films